Sluice Point is a community in the Canadian province of Nova Scotia, located in the Argyle Municipality in Yarmouth County.

Education
The school started with the primary department in 1870. There was opposition to both the school and the Indian Sluice Point Bridge (to Surette's Island). Education was not well understood then, and one man, Jacques Babin, stubbornly affirmed that no bridge or school would be built while he was alive. In the primary department there were about twenty-five seats. It was big enough at that time, but the population increased, so they built the advanced department in 1902.

Climate

Sluice Point lies on a climatic zone known as a humid continental climate (Köppen climate classification Dfb). During this period of time, the weather can be unsettled and cloudy due to the Nor'easters coming up the coast from the southwest, however in the past few years there has been an absence of snowfall. As a result, Sluice Point averages only 85–170 hours of sunshine from December to February or 36%–44% of possible sunshine.

Sluice Point's summers are warm due to the woodlands which keeps summer temperatures warm, meaning temperatures above  are common. Spring and fall are transitional seasons in which falls are warmer than spring since the waters are at the warmest temperatures in fall and the coldest during early spring. July and August the driest months on average and November the wettest month on average.

References

Communities in Yarmouth County
General Service Areas in Nova Scotia